David Alexander Vogan, Jr. (born September 8, 1954) is a mathematician at the Massachusetts Institute of Technology who works on unitary representations of simple Lie groups.

While studying at the University of Chicago, he became a Putnam Fellow in 1972. He received his Ph.D. from M.I.T. in 1976, under the supervision of Bertram Kostant. In his thesis, he introduced the notion of lowest K type in the course of obtaining
an algebraic classification of irreducible Harish Chandra modules.  He is currently one of the participants in the Atlas of Lie Groups and Representations.

Vogan was elected to the American Academy of Arts and Sciences in 1996.  He served as Head of the Department of Mathematics at MIT from 1999 to 2004.
In 2012 he became Fellow of the American Mathematical Society. He was president of the AMS in 2013–2014.  He was elected to the National Academy of Sciences in 2013.
He was the Norbert Wiener Chair of Mathematics at MIT until his retirement in 2020.

Publications
 Representations of real reductive Lie groups. Birkhäuser, 1981
 Unitary representations of reductive Lie groups. Princeton University Press, 1987 
 with Paul Sally (ed.): Representation theory and harmonic analysis on semisimple Lie groups. American Mathematical Society, 1989
 with Jeffrey Adams & Dan Barbasch (ed.): The Langlands Classification and Irreducible Characters for Real Reductive Groups. Birkhäuser, 1992
 with Anthony W. Knapp: Cohomological Induction and Unitary Representations. Princeton University Press, 1995 
 with Joseph A. Wolf and Juan Tirao (ed.): Geometry and representation theory of real and p-adic groups. Birkhäuser, 1998
 with Jeffrey Adams (ed.): Representation theory of Lie groups. American Mathematical Society, 2000
 The Character Table for E8. In: Notices of the American Mathematical Society Nr. 9, 2007 (PDF)

References

External links
Home page for David Vogan
專訪 David Vogan 教授 (Interview with Prof. David Vogan, in Chinese) in 數學傳播. 

Living people
Massachusetts Institute of Technology School of Science alumni
20th-century American mathematicians
21st-century American mathematicians
Putnam Fellows
Fellows of the American Mathematical Society
1954 births
Presidents of the American Mathematical Society
University of Chicago alumni
Mathematicians from Pennsylvania
People from Mercer, Pennsylvania